McLuhan is a surname. Notable people with the surname include:

Eric McLuhan (1941–2018), Canadian writer
Marshall McLuhan (1911–1980), Canadian educator, philosopher and scholar